Music City Executive Airport  is a publicly-owned public-use airport located two nautical miles (4 km) east of the central business district of Gallatin, a city in Sumner County, Tennessee, United States. The airport previously had the designation M33 prior to being changed to XNX.  The airport was named Sumner County Regional Airport prior to June 2019. This airport is included in the National Plan of Integrated Airport Systems for 2011 to 2015, which categorized it as a general aviation airport.

Facilities and aircraft 
Music City Executive Airport covers an area of 332 acres (134 ha) at an elevation of 583 feet (179 m) above mean sea level. It has one runway: 17/35 is 6,300 by 100 feet (1,920 x 30 m) with an asphalt pavement.

For the 12-month period ending December 31, 2017, the airport had 33,750 aircraft operations, an average of 92 per day: 96% general aviation, 4% air taxi, and <1% military. At that time there were 77 aircraft based at this airport: 75% single-engine, 12% multi-engine, 8% jet, and <1% helicopter.

References

External links 
 
 
 

Airports in Tennessee
Buildings and structures in Sumner County, Tennessee
County airports in the United States
Transportation in Sumner County, Tennessee